Charles Córdoba Sánchez (born 15 September 1982) is a Colombian footballer who plays as forward for Xelajú in the Liga Nacional de Guatemala.

Career

Motagua 
On 12 May 2010, Córdoba reached an agreement with F.C. Motagua, signing a two-year contract.

On 27 July, he made his first appearance for the club in the 1st leg of the CONCACAF Champions League Preliminary Round in a 1–0 defeat against Toronto, in which they were eliminated in the 2nd leg with a 2–2 tied. He then made his domestic league debut against Necaxa with a 3–0 on 7 August 2010. Córdoba scored his first goal for F.C. Motagua on 29 September 2010 in a Liga Nacional de Honduras match against Platense, scoring the only goal in a 1–0 victory.

Córdoba played with F.C. Motagua for a half season before leaving for Necaxa with only 7 appearances in the Torneo Apertura.

Necaxa 
On 16 January 2011, Córdoba made his official debut with Necaxa in the Liga Nacional de Honduras against F.C. Motagua in the Estadio Tiburcio Carías Andino, where he scored his first goal in the 30th minute in a 1–1 draw against his previous team. He joined Choloma in summer 2012.

Career statistics

References 

1982 births
Living people
Colombian footballers
Deportivo Pereira footballers
C.D. Real Juventud players
C.D.S. Vida players
F.C. Motagua players
Atlético Choloma players
Heredia Jaguares de Peten players
Parrillas One players
Xelajú MC players
C.D. Marathón players
Juticalpa F.C. players
Colombian expatriate footballers
Expatriate footballers in Honduras
Expatriate footballers in Guatemala
Liga Nacional de Fútbol Profesional de Honduras players
Association football forwards
Sportspeople from Antioquia Department